Ted Clayton may refer to:

 Ted Clayton (One Life to Live), a character on soap opera One Life to Live
 Ted Clayton (cyclist) (1911–1994), South African cyclist